The Abierto Internacional de Golf del Eje Cafetero was an annual golf tournament held in Pereira, Colombia. It was founded in 2005 and became part of the Latin America based Tour de las Américas in 2010.

Winners

External links
Coverage on the Tour de las Américas' official site

Tour de las Américas events
Golf tournaments in Colombia
Recurring sporting events established in 2005
Recurring sporting events disestablished in 2010
2005 establishments in Colombia
2010 disestablishments in Colombia